The 2006 British Rowing Championships were the 35th edition of the National Championships, held from 14–16 July 2006 at the Strathclyde Country Park in Motherwell, North Lanarkshire. They were organised and sanctioned by British Rowing, and are open to British rowers.

Senior

Medal summary

Lightweight

Medal summary

U 23

Medal summary

Junior

Medal summary 

Key

References 

British Rowing Championships
British Rowing Championships
British Rowing Championships